King Hui may refer to:
King Hui of Zhou (reigned 677–652 BC), king of the Zhou Dynasty
King Hui of Chu (reigned 488–432 BC), king of Chu
King Hui of Wei (reigned 370–319 BC), king of Wei
Hui of Balhae (reigned 812–817 AD), king of Balhae